Puka may refer to:

Places

Puka, Estonia
Puka Parish, Estonia
Pukë, or Puka, Albania

Plants

Griselinia lucida, an epiphytic plant/tree from New Zealand
Meryta sinclairii, a threatened tree from New Zealand

Other
Puka (Peru), a mountain in Peru
Puka shell, a popular Hawaiian jewellery
Pikachu, or Puka, a Pokémon

See also
Pucca
Pukka (disambiguation)
Púca, Celtic mythological beast and supposedly the creature behind the invisible rabbit in the fictional story Harvey
Puka Puka (disambiguation)